Crispbread ( (lit. crack bread), hårt bröd (hard bread), hårdbröd, spisbröd (stove bread), knäcke) is a flat and dry type of cracker, containing mostly rye flour. Crispbreads are lightweight and keep fresh for a very long time due to their lack of water. Crispbread is a staple food and was for a long time considered a poor man's diet.

Origins 

Finland and Sweden have long traditions in crispbread consumption. The origin of the crispbread came from the earlier spisbröd (stovebread) which was a similar but thicker kind of bread. These breads were baked from at least the 6th century in central Sweden. They were usually hung above the stove to be dried. Traditional crispbread in Sweden and western Finland is made in  this tradition with the form of a round flat loaf with a hole in the middle to facilitate storage on long poles hanging near the ceiling. Traditionally, crispbreads were baked just twice a year: following harvest and again in the spring when frozen river waters began to flow. The slim crispbread that is common today originated in eastern Värmland. Sweden's first industrial crispbread bakery, AU Bergmans enka, began its production in Stockholm in 1850. Rectangular Knäckebrot was first manufactured in Germany in 1927, and has remained popular and readily available there ever since.

Crispbread in the household is most common in Sweden (figures published in 2003); in Sweden 85 percent of households have crispbread at home, in Germany it is 45 percent and in France 8 percent.

Ingredients 
Crispbread traditionally consists of wholemeal rye flour, salt, and water. Today, however, many kinds of crispbread contain wheat flour, spices and grains, and are often leavened with yeast or sourdough, and milk or sesame seeds can be added.

In the case of unleavened crispbread, bubbles are introduced into the dough mechanically. Traditionally, this was done by mixing snow or powdered ice into the dough, which then evaporated during baking. Today, the dough, which must contain a large amount of water, is cooled and mixed until bubbly.

Another method is to knead the dough under pressure in an extruder. The sudden drop in pressure then causes water to evaporate, creating bubbles in the dough.

Crispbread is only baked for a few minutes, at temperatures usually between 200 and 250 °C.

Serving 
Crispbread itself is very dry and therefore served with a spread, like butter, and optional toppings. Crispbread is usually a part of a daily meal. In Sweden and Finland crispbread and butter or margarine are included in school meals. Crispbread might also be crushed into yogurt or filmjölk in place of cereals or muesli, and even used as a pizza base. In Sweden, crispbread is a common side dish for pea soup, as well as for pickled herring.

Gallery 
Different types and shapes of commercial crispbread:

See also 

 Bublik
 Dorset knob
 Flatbread
 Flatbrød
 Hardtack
 Lavash
 Matzo
 Ryvita, a brand of crispbread
 Tunnbröd
 Wasabröd, a Swedish company

References 

Crackers (food)
Estonian cuisine
Swedish breads
Rye breads
Finnish cuisine
Norwegian cuisine
Early Germanic cuisine